Karl Johan Oskar Fabricius (born 29 September 1982) is a Swedish former professional ice hockey winger, who most notably played with Luleå HF in the Swedish Hockey League (SHL). He previously played the 2011–12 season, with HC Lev Poprad, a team located in Poprad, Slovakia of the Kontinental Hockey League (KHL).

Career statistics

Regular season and playoffs

International

References

External links

1982 births
Living people
Frölunda HC players
Heilbronner Falken players
HC Lev Poprad players
Luleå HF players
Swedish ice hockey forwards
Swedish expatriate ice hockey players in Germany
Swedish expatriate sportspeople in Slovakia
Expatriate ice hockey players in Slovakia
People from Boden Municipality
Sportspeople from Norrbotten County